Federation of Students can be for:

Australian Liberal Students Federation
Black African Students Federation in France
Canadian Federation of Students
Canadian Federation of Engineering Students
Federation of Conservative Students
Federation of Student Islamic Societies
Hong Kong Federation of Students
Student Federation of the University of Ottawa
Students' Federation of India
University of Waterloo Federation of Students
York Federation of Students